Jean Marie Zambo (born January 23, 1959) is a Cameroonian handball coach. He coaches the Cameroonian national team and participated at the 2017 World Women's Handball Championship in Germany.

References

1959 births
Living people
Cameroonian handball coaches
Cameroonian male handball players
Place of birth missing (living people)